Star Wars: Battlefront II may refer to:

 Star Wars: Battlefront II (2005 video game), a 2005 first- and third-person shooter video game
 Star Wars Battlefront II (2017 video game), a 2017 action shooter video game